Super Tuesday is the United States presidential primary election day in February or March when the greatest number of U.S. states hold primary elections and caucuses. Approximately one-third of all delegates to the presidential nominating conventions can be won on Super Tuesday, more than on any other day. The results on Super Tuesday are therefore a strong indicator of the likely eventual nominee of each political party.

The particular states holding primaries on Super Tuesday have varied from year to year because each state selects its election day separate from one another.

Tuesday is the traditional day for elections in the United States. The phrase Super Tuesday has been used to refer to presidential primary elections since at least 1976. It is an unofficial term used by journalists and political pundits.

Background
United States politics are dominated by two major political parties, the Democratic Party and Republican Party, which choose their presidential candidates in nominating conventions attended by delegates from states. State law determines how each party's delegates are chosen in each state by either a primary election or a caucus and on what date those contests are held. State governments or state party organizations choose the date they want for their states' primary or caucus. With the broadened use of the modern presidential primary system (following the chaotic 1968 Democratic National Convention in Chicago), states have tried to increase their influence in the nomination process. One tactic has been to create geographic blocs to encourage candidates to spend time in a region.

One motivation for the creation of Super Tuesday has been criticism and reform proposals of the current primary system, many of which argue for creating a National Primary or a regional primary, such as the Rotating Regional Primary System adopted by the National Association of Secretaries of State in 1999, among other proposals.

1984: Beginnings of Super Tuesday
The 1984 primary season had three "Super Tuesdays". Decided on "Super Tuesday III" were delegates from five states: South Dakota, New Mexico, West Virginia, California and New Jersey. The proportional nature of delegate selection meant that Walter Mondale was likely to obtain enough delegates on that day to win the nomination at the 1984 Democratic National Convention, no matter who actually won the states contested. Gary Hart maintained that unpledged superdelegates that had previously announced support for Mondale would shift to his side if he swept the Super Tuesday III primary. Hart committed a faux pas, insulting New Jersey shortly before the primary day. Campaigning in California, he remarked that while the "bad news" was that he and his wife Lee had to campaign separately, "[t]he good news for her is that she campaigns in California while I campaign in New Jersey." When his wife interjected that she "got to hold a koala bear", Hart replied that "I won't tell you what I got to hold: samples from a toxic waste dump." While Hart won California, he lost New Jersey despite having led in polls by as much as 15 points.

Mondale secured the majority of delegates from the primaries, leading the way for him to take the Democratic nomination. In the 1984 Republican Party primaries, incumbent President Ronald Reagan was the only candidate to secure delegates.

1988: Southern states primary
The phrase "Super Tuesday" was next used to describe the primary elections that took place on March 8, 1988, in the Southern states of Texas, Florida, Tennessee, Louisiana, Oklahoma, Mississippi, Kentucky, Alabama, and Georgia leading up to the 1988 United States presidential election. In the 1988 Democratic Party primaries, Southern Democrats came up with the idea of a regional primary in an effort to nominate a moderate candidate who would more closely represent their interests. However, Dick Gephardt, Jesse Jackson, Al Gore, and Michael Dukakis split the Super Tuesday primaries, and Dukakis was subsequently nominated. George H. W. Bush secured most of the delegates in the 1988 Republican Party primaries. From 1996 to 2004, most of the Southern primaries were held the week after Super Tuesday, on a day dubbed "Southern Tuesday" by news commentators.

1992–2000
In 1992, after losing earlier primaries, Democrat Bill Clinton won several Southern primaries on Super Tuesday en route to winning the 1992 Democratic nomination and later the presidency. On the other hand, incumbent George H. W. Bush, faced opposition from Pat Buchanan in the Republican primaries that year.

In 1996, Super Tuesday was on March 12. Bob Dole swept Super Tuesday en route to his bid for the 1996 Republican nomination. Clinton, the incumbent president, secured all the delegates in the 1996 Democratic primaries.

In 2000, Super Tuesday was on March 7. Sixteen states held primaries on Super Tuesday, the largest presidential primary election day in U.S. history up to that point. Approximately 81% of Democratic delegates and 18% of Republican delegates needed to secure nomination were up for grabs. Democrat Al Gore and Republican George W. Bush cemented their nomination bids with Super Tuesday victories, and both went on to win their parties' nominations.

2004: Mini-Tuesday

In 2004, several states moved their presidential contests up to February 3, 2004, in order to increase the relative importance of their election results. Five states held primaries and two held caucuses and the day was eventually nicknamed Mini-Tuesday or Super Tuesday I by pundits, with the traditional March Super Tuesday date, March 2, christened Super Tuesday II, or just "Super Tuesday." While the results of Mini-Tuesday had far-reaching implications for the Democratic primaries, the Republican primaries were uncontested as incumbent President George W. Bush was the presumptive nominee.

2008

To increase importance of their votes, 24 states with over half the delegates to the national conventions moved to change their primary dates to February 5, 2008, creating the largest "Super Tuesday" to date. Newswriters and political pundits noted that it would dwarf the Super Tuesday primaries in previous cycles. Because of its political magnitude, some pundits have variously dubbed it "Giga Tuesday," "Mega Giga Tuesday," "Tsunami Tuesday" or even "Super Duper Tuesday."

With only four states holding elections on the other Super Tuesday March 4, 2008, one pundit said "Super Tuesday isn't so super."

2012

Super Tuesday in 2012 took place on March 6, 2012, totaling 419 delegates (18.3% of the total) in 10 states in the Republican primaries. The Democratic primaries were mostly uncontested as incumbent President Barack Obama was the assured nominee.

The impact of Super Tuesday was lessened by Mitt Romney's convincing victories preceding Super Tuesday. Frontrunner Romney was able to increase his lead significantly, with wins in six states and won over half the delegates at stake. Santorum's three wins, and a near-win in Ohio, allowed him to carry on as a candidate for another month.

2016

Super Tuesday I 

Super Tuesday in the 2016 presidential election was held on March 1, 2016. This date was dubbed the SEC Primary, since many of the participating states were represented in the U.S. Southeastern Conference for college athletics (five southern states).

The participating states included Alabama, Arkansas, Colorado, Georgia, Massachusetts, Minnesota (with caucuses), Oklahoma, Tennessee, Texas, Vermont, and Virginia. Additionally, Republican caucuses were held in Alaska, North Dakota, and Wyoming. The territory of American Samoa held a Democratic caucus.

The Republican candidates could win about half of the 1,237 delegates needed to secure the nomination. The two remaining Democrats were after 880 delegates, roughly one-third of those needed to win. The number of delegates from Texas is much greater than the other states: 155 for Republicans and 252 for Democrats.

The Democratic primaries and caucuses concluded with Hillary Clinton winning Alabama, Arkansas, Georgia, Massachusetts, Tennessee, Texas, and Virginia, and Bernie Sanders winning Colorado, Minnesota, Oklahoma, and Vermont. Clinton received 486 delegates, and Sanders received 321.

The Republican primaries and caucuses concluded with Donald Trump winning Alabama, Arkansas, Georgia, Massachusetts, Tennessee, Vermont, and Virginia; Ted Cruz winning Alaska, Oklahoma, and Texas; and Marco Rubio winning Minnesota. John Kasich and Ben Carson were also in the election, but neither won any states. Results from the North Dakota and Wyoming caucuses are yet to be determined, though their delegates are not required to support the winners of those contests and can freely pledge to their preferred candidate during their respective state party conventions.

Additionally, several third-party primaries were held on March 1. The Libertarian Party hosted its caucus in Minnesota, which was won by Gary Johnson. The Green Party of the United States hosted two contests, a primary in Massachusetts and a caucus in Minnesota, both of which were won by Jill Stein.

Super Tuesday II 

March 15, 2016, was dubbed Super Tuesday II, Mega Tuesday, or the Ides of March Primaries. Five states held both Democratic and Republican primaries: Illinois, Florida, North Carolina, Ohio, and Missouri. Republican caucuses were also held in the Northern Marianas Islands. The Republican races were particularly significant as four of these (excepting the North Carolina primary) were the first in the cycle to use winner-takes-all voting systems. Republican contests held prior to March 14 were only permitted to use proportional systems. There were 697 delegates at stake for Democrats and 358 delegates for Republicans.

Some media sources referred to the contests on March 8 as Super Tuesday II, where two states held Democratic contests and four states held Republican contests, and referred to the March 15 contests as Super Tuesday III.

2020

Super Tuesday was on March 3, 2020. Alabama, Arkansas, California, Colorado, Maine, Massachusetts, Minnesota, North Carolina, Oklahoma, Tennessee, Texas, Utah, Vermont, and Virginia all held their presidential primaries on that date. American Samoa had its caucus that day; as a territory it did not participate in the general election in November. The Democrats Abroad primary, for Democrats living outside of the United States, started voting on March 3, and concluded on March 10. 1,357, or 34.1%, of the 3,979 pledged delegates to be awarded to the candidates in the Democratic primaries were allotted on Super Tuesday. 1,617 total delegates were available to be awarded to the candidates. This was driven in large part by the two most populous states in the country, California and Texas, allotting 415 and 228 delegates, respectively, on Super Tuesday.

Joe Biden won Alabama, Arkansas, Maine, Massachusetts, Minnesota, North Carolina, Oklahoma, Tennessee, Texas, and Virginia; Bernie Sanders won California, Colorado, Utah, and his home state of Vermont; and Michael Bloomberg won American Samoa. Elizabeth Warren and Tulsi Gabbard failed to win any contest.

In the Republican primaries, incumbent President Donald Trump defeated challenger Bill Weld in the Super Tuesday Republican primaries. Among the Super Tuesday states, Trump was uncontested in Maine and Minnesota, as both the Maine and Minnesota state Republican parties left Weld off their ballots. The Virginia Republican Party went a step further and decided to cancel its primary altogether and select their delegates directly at its state party convention.

See also 
 Democratic Party presidential primaries
 Republican Party presidential primaries

References

Tuesday
United States presidential primaries
February observances
March observances
Recurring events established in 1984
1984 establishments in the United States

he:הבחירות המקדימות לנשיאות ארצות הברית#סופר טיוזדיי